Kasindo is a neighbourhood in the city of Istočno Sarajevo in Istočna Ilidža municipality, Republika Srpska, Bosnia and Herzegovina. Kasindo is also the old name for this municipality. The clinical center of Istočno Sarajevo is in this part of the city.

References

Istočno Sarajevo
Populated places in Istočna Ilidža